Triple J (stylised in all lowercase) is a government-funded, national Australian radio station intended to appeal to listeners of alternative music, which began broadcasting in January 1975. The station also places a greater emphasis on broadcasting Australian content compared to commercial stations.
Triple J is a division of the Australian Broadcasting Corporation.

History

1970s: Launch and early years
2JJ commenced broadcasting at 11:00 am, Sunday 19 January 1975, at 1540 kHz (which switched to 1539kHz in 1978) on the AM band. The new Australian Broadcasting Corporation (ABC) station was given the official call-sign 2JJ, but soon became commonly known as Double J. The station was restricted largely to the greater Sydney region, and its local reception was hampered by inadequate transmitter facilities. However, its frequency was a clear channel nationally, so it was easily heard at night throughout south-eastern Australia. After midnight the station would often use ABC networks – during their off air time slot – to increase its broadcasting range.

Its first broadcast demonstrated a determination to distinguish itself from other Australian radio stations. The first on-air presenter, DJ Holger Brockmann, notably used his own name (a deliberate reference to his former work for top-rated Sydney pop station 2SM). Owing to 2SM's restrictive policies at the time, Brockmann, whose real name was considered "too foreign-sounding", had been forced to work using the pseudonym "Bill Drake" in prior positions. After an introductory audio collage that featured sounds from the countdown and launch of Apollo 11, Brockmann launched the station's first-ever broadcast with the words, "Wow, and we're away!", and then cued The Skyhooks' You Just Like Me 'Cos I'm Good in Bed.

The choice of a Skyhooks song to introduce the station was significant, as it represented several important features of the Double J brand at the time. Choosing an Australian band reflected Double J's commitment to Australian content at a time when American acts dominated commercial pop stations. The song was one of several tracks from the Skyhooks' album that had been banned from airplay on commercial radio by the industry's peak body.

Because Double J was a government-funded station operating under the umbrella of the ABC, it was not bound by commercial-radio censorship codes, and was not answerable to advertisers or the station owners. In contrast, their Sydney rival, 2SM, was owned by a holding company controlled by the Catholic Archdiocese of Sydney, resulting in the ban or editing of numerous songs.

2JJ was a product of the progressive media policies of the Whitlam Government of 1972–75, and combined influences from several earlier ABC programs, such as "Room to Move", as well as the freewheeling programming policies of British pirate radio and BBC Radio 1, which was created to target the pirate radio audience. The inspiration gained from the UK led to Double J adopting the tradition of weekly, live-in-the-studio performances by pop and rock bands. Gough Whitlam was unable to also fulfill his aspiration for the establishment of a "National Youth Radio Network", as he was controversially sacked.

2JJ presenter, and the first female DJ on Australian pop radio, Gayle Austin, who was completing a Master of Arts(MA) on Triple J's first 16 years in 2005, explained that 2JJ staff had also heard of other motivations for the founding of the station:

Word was the Whitlam government wanted to set the station up to woo young voters. We also heard that the ABC was worried about its audience dying off and wanted a station for young people who would grow up to be ABC listeners.

Additionally, the station was one of a series of innovations that stemmed from the recommendations in the McLean Report of 1974. These included expanding radio broadcasting onto the FM band, issuing a new class of broadcasting license which finally permitted the establishment of community radio stations (the long-awaited third tier of the Australian radio industry), and the creation of two new stations for the ABC – 2JJ in Sydney and the short-lived 3ZZ in Melbourne.

By the time 2JJ went to air, the Whitlam government was in its final months of office. Marius Webb, one of the station's co-ordinators recalls an ABC executive informing him: "You'll be on the air by January. Thank you very much, I've got another meeting." On 11 November 1975, Whitlam's commission was revoked by Governor-General Sir John Kerr, sparking a double dissolution of parliament. In the subsequent 1975 federal election, Labor was defeated by the Liberal-National Party coalition that was led by Malcolm Fraser. During the more conservative media climate that emerged in the Fraser years, 2JJ staff were frequently accused of left-wing bias. 2JJ was initially intended to be the first link in Whitlam's planned national youth network; but the expansion was greatly delayed by the election of the Fraser government and the subsequent budget cuts it imposed on the ABC.

It was a historic moment in Australian radio, when the station decided to hire a female disc jockey and, excluding the first experimental FM licences, was granted the first new radio licence issued in any Australian capital city since 1932.

In its early years 2JJ's on-air staff were mainly recruited from either commercial radio or other ABC stations. Later, in another first, the roster also featured presenters who did not come from a radio industry background, including singer-songwriters Bob Hudson and John J. Francis, and actor Lex Marinos. Francis commenced broadcasting in the Saturday midnight-to-dawn shift in 1975, and the program became so popular that it was expanded to include Friday and Sunday nights two years later.

The foundation staff of January 1975 were: Webb and Ron Moss (co-ordinators), Ros Cheney, David Ives, Sam Collins, Holger Brockman (aka Bill Drake), Caroline Pringle, Bob Hudson, Mike Parker, Iven Walker, Arnold Frolows, Di Auburn, Margot Edwards, George "Groover" Wayne who often called himself "G" (the hard 'G'), Graeme Berry, John Arden, Colin Vercoe, Alan McGirvan, Pam Swain, Graeme Bartlett, Tony Maniaty, John Arden, Keith Walker and Michael Byrne. Other popular presenters of the 2JJ period included Austin (a former producer for talkback radio king John Laws), Mark Colvin, Jim Middleton, Russell Guy, Mac Cocker (father of musician Jarvis Cocker), and Keri Phillips. Several of the original team developed successful careers at the ABC: Mark Colvin hosted ABC Radio National's current affairs show PM; Jim Middleton hosts Newsline with Jim Middleton on ABC Television; Keri Phillips isa long-serving presenter and producer on ABC Radio National and Ros Cheney was Arts Editor of ABC radio until her dismissal in 2001 (during the controversial regime of Jonathan Shier).

2JJ's programming policies were considered a radical departure from the formats of commercial stations. In 2005 Austin published a recollection from Colin Vercoe, one of the station's first music programmers: "In those days it was the early disco stuff and if it was black they just wouldn't play it." Although the station  was primarily oriented towards a pop-rock format, the range of music programmed on Double Jay in its early years music was far wider than any of its commercial rivals, encompassing both mainstream and alternative rock and pop, experimental and electronic music, progressive rock, funk, soul, disco, the emerging ambient, punk and New Wave genres of the late 70s and, most notably, reggae, a genre that was gaining wide popularity in the UK but which was being almost totally ignored by Australian commercial radio.  For several years in the late 1970s Double Jay presented "The Dogs of Babylon" a three-hour weekly Sunday afternoon shift exclusively featuring reggae and dub music.

In sharp contrast to the highly restrictive and tightly controlled local versions of the Drake-Chenault "More Music" format that prevailed on Australian commercial radio at the time, Double Jay's presenters had almost total freedom in their on-air delivery, and both the presenters and the station staff participated in music programming decisions. 2JJ was also a pioneer in terms of its coverage of local music. Austin stated in a 2005 ABC radio special to commemorate the youth station's 30th anniversary: "There was very little Australian music. At that time Australian music didn’t have much production put into it because there wasn’t much money made out of it." 2JJ announcer Chris Winter explained that "there was enormous breadth of music around at the time" that was not played on radio, but could be heard in private gatherings or bought from specialist stores. Austin states that the original aim of 2JJ was to highlight "our own culture" and the staff were expected to "provide an alternative to the mainstream, with a heavy emphasis on Australian content". 2JJ consequently garnered a reputation for not only eclectic playlists, but also radical talk content:

... it was in the talk area that the really radical work was done. Comedy segments such as the sci-fi parody "Chuck Chunder of the Space Patrol", Captain Goodvibes, "Nude Radio" (presented by the stars of the cult TV comedy series The Aunty Jack Show, Grahame Bond, Rory O'Donoghue and Garry McDonald), Fred Dagg (aka John Clarke) and the station's legendary "anti-ads" informed future program-makers on how humour could be used on radio.

The station also sought to create a genuine dialogue with listeners, whereby the audience could claim a sense of ownership of the station, and announcers even played demo tapes recorded by listeners who were also musicians, the start of what is now known as Triple J Unearthed. Austin explained in 2005:

In that first year we had a station policy of access all areas. In early March, women took over the station as announcers to celebrate International Women's Day. The listeners owned the station, too, and if they wanted to come to the meetings and join the debate, they were welcome. This attitude led to some interesting moments, such as when Holger Brockman's shift was hijacked by three Aboriginal activists. They entered the studio and said they were armed and hijacking the station. Brockman said: "Oh, OK. Well, that's the microphone there, and here you are, have my seat." Brockman says they were really polite. "They said their bit, which took about five or 10 minutes, and then politely handed back to me – 'And now back to Holger.' Respectfully, like family."

The station played an unprecedented level of Australian content, as well as imported music, music brought in from the staff's personal collections, music purchased by overseas correspondents, and songs banned by other stations because of religious or sexual controversies. The first song played on air on the first broadcast day, "You Just Like Me 'Cos I'm Good in Bed" by the Skyhooks, was banned on commercial radio for its explicit sexual content.<ref>{{cite web|url=http://www.theage.com.au/news/Music/Strike-up-the-banned/2005/06/17/1118869080230.html |title=Warwick McFadyen, "Strike Up The Banned", The Age, 18 June 2005 |access-date=28 October 2009 |publisher=Theage.com.au |date=18 June 2005}}</ref>

Double J also featured regular news broadcasts, current affairs programs, political commentary by noted journalist Mungo MacCallum, and audio documentaries like the controversial The Ins and Outs of Love (produced by former 2SM producers Carl Tyson-Hall and Tony Poulsen), which included frank interviews with young people about their first experiences of sex. The Tyson-Hall and Poulsen documentary had allegedly "breached community standards" and, although the ABC reportedly received few direct complaints about The Ins and Outs of Love (originally broadcast on Sunday, 23 February 1975), the documentary sparked a debate in the media and the Broadcasting Control Board (BCB) reportedly asked for talks with the ABC. Two days after the documentary was broadcast, Fairfax tabloid The Sun published an editorial calling for the station to be closed, and a week later, on 10 March 1975, the influential marketing/advertising industry journal B&T followed suit, demanding that the station should be forced to undertake one of three options: (i) 2JJ should be closed down; (ii) 2JJ's programming should be completely revamped; or (iii) the removal of those staff responsible for "the present series of lapses". Austin explained in 2005 that Webb was largely responsible for shielding the station from external criticism.

The station rapidly gained popularity, especially with its target youth demographic: media articles noted that in its first two months on air, 2JJ reached a 5.4% share of the total radio audience, with 17% in the 18–24 age group, while the audience share of rival 2SM dropped by 2.3%. Despite the poor quality of reception caused by the Sydney transmitter, the station still saw rapid growth. Austin explained that station staff threatened industrial action in July 1975 due to the transmitter issues, but officials of the BCB still refused to meet with 2JJ representatives. A new transmitter was not provided until 1980, following the transition to the FM band.

2JJ presenter George "Groover" Wayne, who hosted the show Cooking with George, became very popular, but was also part of the station's controversial reputation. Originally from South Africa, Wayne was fondly remembered by a listener for the 30-year anniversary event: "I remember George being booted off air. One night, reading the gig guide, he announced a fund raiser for NORML where the lucky door prize (or raffle) was a block of hash. I can't remember how long he was off air but he went home early that night." Former Triple J DJ Ian Rogerson stated: "He had this fantastic voice and presence on air...He was just a great communicator...I really miss him."

Controversy also emerged after the station hosted an open-air concert in Liverpool, in Sydney's south-west, in June 1975 (featuring Skyhooks and Dragon). A page-one headline in the Sydney Sun that read "Rock Concert Filth Uproar" introduced a story that claimed that many were "shocked" by "depictions of sexual depravity and shouted obscenities", which allegedly caused women in the audience to clap their hands over their ears, and reportedly prompted Coalition frontbencher Peter Nixon to call for the station to be closed down. The station regularly sponsored live concerts and organised a number of major outdoor concert events in the late 1970s, culminating in an outdoor, all-day event in Parramatta Park, Sydney on 18 January 1981 to celebrate the end of Double J and the start of 2JJJ. Attended by 40,000 people, the historic concert featured Midnight Oil and Matt Finish.

1980s: National expansion
On 1 August 1980 2JJ began broadcasting on the FM band at a frequency of 105.7 MHz (again restricted to within the greater Sydney region) and became 2JJJ (later, Triple J). Test transmissions in the lead-up to the FM launch used the innovative device of broadcasting stereo audio-verité recordings made by ABC staff, and, in a deliberate echo of the original Double Jay launch, the first song played on the new FM incarnation was another track then banned from commercial radio, "Gay Guys" by Dugites. Through the mid-to-late eighties, Triple J continued to pioneer new music and developed a wide range of special-interest programs including the Japanese pop show Nippi Rock Shop, Arnold Frolows' weekly late-night ambient music show Ambience, and Jaslyn Hall's world music show, the first of its kind on Australian mainstream radio.. For several years in the late 1970s and early 1980s the breakfast shift was presented by Doug Mulray, which featured regular input from Mulray's long-serving collaborator Ken Sterling, who regularly  impersonated then Prime Minister Malcolm Fraser (as "The Prime Mincer"), while Mulray often performed a parody of TV scientist Julius Sumner-Miller. Stirling and Mulray also wrote and produced a popular series of parodic "anti-ads". One of the show's most popular features was the Doctor Who parody serial "Dr Poo", written and performed by comedians Lance Curtis, Geoff Kelso, Steve Johnstone and Ken Matthews, although the series was cancelled in 1981 following the station's transition to the FM band. Mulray continued on the Triple J breakfast shift until 1982, when he was poached by rival commercial FM rock station Triple M, where he became very popular, presenting their breakfast shift for the next ten years.

On 19 January 1981 at 12:00 PM , the AM transmissions ceased, and 2JJJ became an FM only station. It was not until the late 1980s that the ABC was finally able to begin development of the long-delayed national "youth network". Between October 1989 to the end of 1990, JJJ expanded to: Adelaide, Brisbane, Canberra, Darwin, Hobart, Melbourne, Newcastle, and Perth.

In 1983, four Triple J presenters – Peter Doyle, Virginia Moncrieff, Tony Barrell and Clive Miller – began producing a fanzine with the inscrutable title of Alan. Designed in a manic collage style by David Art Wales, Alan featured programming information, pop trivia, and irreverent interviews with recording artists. Wales also supplied a comic strip featuring a boy sage named Guru Adrian. In a twist that added to the character's appeal, the Guru's face was that of a real child whose identity was never revealed, leading many to believe that he was in fact a real guru. Guru Adrian's philosophy, "Adrianetics", consisted of quixotic maxims, including: "Having fun is half the fun," "Gee, you are you" and "Realise your real eyes," which rapidly gained the character a cult following in Australia, with Wales making many radio and television appearances during the mid-1980s to discuss the Guru Adrian phenomenon.

In 1984, Wales teamed with renowned Australian journalist Bruce Elder on the book Radio With Pictures: The History of Double Jay and Triple Jay.

In the late 1980s, Barry Chapman (Programme Director 2SM 1977–80, and managing director EMI Music Publishing 1983–89) was appointed as general manager to oversee Triple J's network expansion. His tenure, and the expansion of the network, generated controversy, most notably in 1990, when a large portion of 2JJJ's Sydney-based on air staff was fired, (the so-called "Night of the long knives") including the most popular presenters Tony Biggs and Tim Ritchie, the station's dance-music maven. As details of the changes became public, there were accusations of a "JJJ Bland Out" (analogous to Harry Enfield's fictional British DJs Smashie and Nicey) and several protests were held outside its William Street studios. There was a public meeting that packed the Sydney Town Hall with angry listeners. The crowd spilled out onto the street as the hall was not big enough to hold everyone who felt that "their" beloved radio station had been hijacked.

Concern was expressed about the introduction of a more highly programmed music format, and the appointment of Chapman was seen as an indication of a more commercial direction. Management responded that to launch a national network meant that the station must broaden its then almost-exclusive focus on the Sydney music scene, requiring the addition of new talent. When the dispute waned, the radio programming was not nearly as free-form as it had been before going national, but neither was it as highly programmed as its critics feared. In the pre-national era, there had been less emphasis on a structured playlist but the introduction of a tighter playlist allowed (at least initially) a degree of input from individual presenters that exceeded that usually permitted on a commercial station.

The laissez-faire collective management style of the Double Jay days was gradually replaced by a more business-like top-down management style. Prior to the controversial appointment of Chapman, many of the 'old guard' were dismissed from the station and replaced by presenters who were more amenable to the increasingly structured format.

Chapman oversaw a radical overhaul of Triple J's programming and marketing. This basic format, though not dissimilar to the old Sydney based Triple J, included: an early morning comedy breakfast program with duo presenters, a late morning talk and talkback program, and a light talk-and-comedy afternoon drive-time shift. Decades later the format remains substantially in place. Compared to the late 1970s, Chapman did not reduce the amount of comedy, documentaries and news. Although as he did at 2SM, Chapman maintained and strengthened the station's commitment to live music.

In the late 1980s Triple J was accused of ignoring the emerging hip hop scene and related genres, in favour of the more marketable rock-oriented grunge style that dominated American music at the same time.

1990s: Regional expansion
The number of news comedy programs and documentaries remained essentially the same in the 1990s as it was during the 1980s. The key changes were new programmes replacing old. Throughout the 1990s, Triple J commenced expansion to more regional areas of Australia and, in 1994, it was extended to another 18 regional centres throughout the country. In 1996, the total was brought to 44, with the new additions including: Launceston, Tasmania; Albany, Western Australia; Bathurst, New South Wales and Mackay, Queensland. As of 2006, Triple J's most recent expansion was to Broome, Western Australia.

2000s: Transition to online content
In May 2003, Arnold Frolows, the only remaining member of the original Double Jay staff of 1975, stepped down after 28 years as Triple J music director. He was replaced by presenter Richard Kingsmill.

In 2004, the station began to release podcasts of some of its talkback shows, including Dr Karl, This Sporting Life, and Hack.

In 2006, Triple J's coverage expanded when transmission began in Broome, Western Australia. As Broome was one of the largest towns in Australia to not receive Triple J to this point, the station celebrated with a concert featuring many local bands, also simulcast on the Live at the Wireless programme.

Also in 2006, Triple J launched jtv, a series of television programs broadcast on ABC and ABC2, as well as being made available online. Programming included music videos, live concerts, documentaries, and comedy, as well as a behind-the-scenes look at Triple J's studios. In 2008 jtv was rebranded as Triple J TV. Triple J TV's first 'spin-off' series The Hack Half Hour premiered on 22 September 2008, hosted by Steve Cannane.

2010s: Digital radio, Double J, Beat The Drum
In 2014, ABC's Dig Music digital radio station joined the Triple J family and was relaunched as Double J on 30 April 2014. The new station features both new music and material from Triple J interview and sound archives. Former Triple J announcer Myf Warhurst, who hosted the inaugural shift, said "it's for people who love music, and also love a bit of music history."

The station celebrated its 40th anniversary on 16 January 2015 with the seven-hour "Beat The Drum" event at the Domain venue in Sydney. Hosted by Peter Garrett, an Australian musician with Midnight Oil and former federal Environment Minister, the list of performers, all of whom are the beneficiaries of the station's support, included: Hilltop Hoods, The Presets, The Cat Empire, You Am I, Daniel Johns, Joelistics, Ball Park Music, Adalita, Vance Joy, and Gotye. The majority of performers played a combination of their own music and cover versions, including Sarah Blasko and Paul Dempsey's rendition of Crowded House's "Distant Sun", and The Preatures covering "At First Sight" by The Stems and The Divinyls' "All the Boys in Town".

In ratings released in August 2015, Triple J was the highest or equal first in Sydney, Melbourne, Brisbane, Adelaide and Perth in the 25–39 demographic.

Programming

Current programming mix

Triple J frequently features new, alternative music and local Australian performers, and programming which used to show a bias against bubblegum pop and top 40 hits. Triple J has nightly specialist programs in different musical genres (see the programmes section below). It also covers news and current affairs from a youth-oriented perspective, although this facet of its programming has been reduced considerably since the station's inception.

In common with other Australian radio stations, Triple J has also gradually increased the amount of talkback content in its programming. There are several reasons for this. Most importantly, it provides an inexpensive and popular source of program content, and also provides the appearance of listener interactivity and involvement. Like many other former 'all music' stations, Triple J has had to respond to the advent of music file-sharing, digital music players, and other digital music innovations, which have drastically reduced listeners' dependence on radio as a means of accessing music.

Evolution of programming
The evolution of Triple J's programming has always been contentious. In the Double Jay days, commercial stations and conservatives regularly cried foul over the station's free use of expletives on air and its ability to ignore the censorship restrictions that were in force for commercial radio. This situation stemmed from Double Jay's status as a special unit of the ABC which, at that time, was only answerable to the ABC Board and the Minister for Communications, unlike the commercial stations, which were subject to regulation by the old Broadcasting Control Board (now the Australian Communications and Media Authority) and by their own peak body, the Federation of Australian Commercial Broadcasters (FACB), now known as Commercial Radio Australia.

Over the years the station gained considerable renown for breaking new local acts. Midnight Oil, the prime example of this, would almost certainly not have had the success they enjoyed without the help of Double Jay/Triple J. The station also broke countless overseas acts who were being ignored in their home countries. Double Jay was virtually the only 'pop' station in Australia in the late Seventies to play reggae, dub, punk rock, new wave, world music, electronic music, and ambient music.

Over the years the station moved away from its early style, which featured a high level of news, features, documentaries, current affairs, and comedy, and was gradually steered towards a non-commercial version of the continuous music format that prevailed in commercial radio. Many original Double Jay segments including the nightly "What's On" gig guide, its extensive news and current affairs coverage, and its 'community noticeboard' segment, were gradually eliminated, as were almost all the character comedy spots that had been popular features in previous years.

Effect on mainstream media
The station also exerted a noticeable effect on local record companies. For many years, local record labels would only import recordings that they knew would earn a good commercial return, and they were often unwilling to take risks on local releases of unknown acts. Much new music was routinely available only as expensive imports in specialist shops. This began to change almost as soon as Double Jay came on air. A good example of the station's influence was in 1976 when Double Jay championed a new album, 801 Live, recorded by a one-off group that included former Roxy Music members Phil Manzanera and Brian Eno. Although the LP was hailed overseas as one of the best live recordings ever made, and set new standards of technical excellence, the Australian distributor at first refused to release it locally, in spite of the fact that it was one of the most requested items on the Double Jay playlist at the time. As a result of the import sales that were generated by Double Jay airplay – it became the highest selling import album that year – the company decided to release it locally.

Triple J routinely championed many local and overseas acts whose early recordings were ignored by commercial radio including: Midnight Oil, Models, Paul Kelly, The Clash, Sex Pistols, Public Image Ltd, Nirvana, Foo Fighters, Pixies, Ben Folds Five, and hundreds more. As with the ABC's long-running pop TV show Countdown, the support of Triple J in Australia also had a strong effect on the success of emerging overseas acts. A case in point is American group The B-52's. It is believed that Double Jay was the first radio station in the world to play their debut single "Rock Lobster". The support of Double Jay/Triple J had a similarly significant effect on the worldwide success of many acts, including: Blondie, Devo, and more recently Ben Folds Five, Garbage, and especially Ben Harper, whose popularity in Australia, which was almost entirely the result of support from Triple J, was instrumental in breaking him back in his home country, the United States.

It is also notable that Triple J was for many years routinely used as a free market research facility by commercial stations. As mainstream pop radio struggled to establish itself on the FM band, commercial stations like those owned by Austereo constantly monitored what songs and acts were doing well on Triple J and would then introduce the most 'saleable' of them into their own playlists. Acts like Talking Heads, The Police, and Nirvana unquestionably owed their commercial success in Australia to the early support of Double Jay/Triple J.

In 1990, Triple J had been playing N.W.A's protest song "Fuck tha Police" for up to six months, before catching the attention of ABC management who subsequently banned it. As a result, the staff went on strike and put the group's song "Express Yourself" on continuous play for 24 hours, playing it roughly 82 times in a row. In 2014, when launching Double J on digital radio, the station played nothing but "Express Yourself" for 48 hours.

Presenters
Many Double Jay and early Triple J presenters went on to successful careers with commercial stations, the most notable being Doug Mulray, who honed his distinctive comedy-based style at the Jays before moving to rival FM rock station 2-MMM (Triple M) in the 1980s, where he became the most popular breakfast presenter in Sydney (and one of the highest-paid radio personalities in the country). Presenter Annette Shun Wah went on to host the popular Rock Around the World series on SBS and is now a program executive with SBS TV and producer of The Movie Show.

Current presenters

 Bryce Mills
 Concetta Carista
 Lucy Smith
 Dave Woodhead
 Lewis Hobba
 Michael Hing
 Avani Dias
 Latifa Tee
 Declan Byrne
 Lochlan Watt
 Josh "Redbeard" Merriel
 Dr. Karl
 Kobie Dee
 Stacy Gougoulis
 Tyrone Pynor
 Jess Perkins
 Jade Zoe
 Shantan Wantan Ichiban
 Nooky
 Richard Kingsmill
 Dee Salmin
 Pip Rasmussen<triple j website>

Events
Hottest 100

The Hottest 100 is an annual poll of the previous year's most popular songs, as voted by its listeners. It has been conducted for over two decades in its present form, and in 2016 attracted 2.26 million votes from 172 countries. It is promoted as the "world's greatest music democracy" and has also spawned a series of compilation CDs, and more recently, music DVDs, released via ABC Music. The countdown of the poll had regularly taken place on Australia Day from 1998 to 2017. In response to controversy surrounding Australia Day celebrations and an extensive poll of Triple J listeners, it was announced in November 2017 that future countdowns would be aired on the fourth weekend of January to avoid associations with the Australia Day holiday.

Unearthed

Unearthed, an ongoing project to find hidden talent, began in 1995. It originally focused on regional areas but now covers all of Australia. Many of these discoveries have been very successful. Some, such as Grinspoon, Killing Heidi, and Missy Higgins, have even been successful enough to receive commercial radio airplay. The Unearthed competition was inspired by the success of a talent search on SBS program Nomad called "Pick Me". This segment, co-produced by Triple J, discovered a trio from Newcastle called the "Innocent Criminals", who later gained international fame under the name Silverchair.

On 5 October 2011, Triple J Unearthed (-styled triple j unearthed) was launched as a radio station available on digital radio and online. It allows listeners to rate and review songs uploaded by bands and musicians.

Triple j unearthed runs a competition to select an Indigenous Australian artist to play the National Indigenous Music Awards, known as the Unearthed National Indigenous Music Awards Competition, Unearthed NIMAs Competition, or simply NIMA Unearthed. Past winners have included Dallas Woods, Thelma Plum, Baker Boy, Alice Skye, and Kuren. In 2021, Tilly Tjala Thomas won the award. Thomas sings in both Nukunu language and English, and performed her song "Ngai Yulku" in both languages. The 2022 winner was JACOTÉNE.

Beat the Drum
Triple J occasionally runs a competition known as 'Beat the Drum' – named for their logo of three drumsticks hitting a drum. It is a competition designed to promote the logo, whereby, whoever displays it in the most prominent place would win a prize. Notable entries include:
 A girl who distributed postcards of herself with the Triple J logo painted on her naked buttocks
 A Triple J T-shirt being waved behind the final lap of, and the presentation of a gold medal for Kieren Perkins' victorious 1500 m swim at, the 1996 Atlanta Olympics
 One of the 2000 Sydney Olympics opening ceremony participants wearing a Triple J T-shirt bearing the logo
 The placement of a large Triple J logo on the musicians' platform at the closing ceremony of the 2000 Sydney Olympics.
 The winner in 2000 who drove his car, converted into a large 3D drum logo, across Australia.
 A group of people erecting road signs with the Triple J frequency all the way up the east coast of Australia
 A farmer in Queensland who formed a drum logo shaped crop circle measuring 1 by 1.5 km in his wheat-fields. This entry won in the individual/small group category in 2004.
 Students from the University of Tasmania's Hobart Campus stripping down to their underwear and painting themselves red to form the logo on the university's football oval which was then aerially photographed.

In late 2004, the station's promotion for that year's Beat the Drum contest caused a brief but bitter controversy after it released a series of promotional images featuring the 'Drum' logo. Many were outraged by the inclusion of a mocked-up image of the former World Trade Center draped with a huge Drum flag.

In 2015 no "One Night Stand" was held. Instead "Beat The Drum" was held.
To commemorate the 40th anniversary of Triple J a one-off concert was held on 16 January at The Domain, Sydney. Artists included: Ball Park Music, Vance Joy, The Preatures, You Am I, The Cat Empire, The Presets, Hilltop Hoods, and many special guests.

Impossible Music Festival

The Impossible Music Festival, broadcast in August 2005 was a celebration of 30 years of live music recordings made by JJ and Triple J. Voted for by listeners from over 1000 recorded gigs/concerts, the broadcast went from 18:00 Friday the 26th to 01:00 Monday the 29th. The 2006 Impossible Music Festival was aired on the weekend of 7–8 October. The 2007 Impossible Music Festival broadcast from Friday 25 May to Sunday 27 May. The 2008 Impossible Music Festival was broadcast from Friday 19 September until Sunday 21 September.

Triple J's One Night Stand

The One Night Stand, held annually since 2004, offers a small town the opportunity to host a free, all ages concert, sponsored by Triple J, featuring three or four Australian musical acts. Entries must include examples of local support, including community (signatures), local government (council approval), and a venue for the concert.

Aus Music Month
Each November on Triple J is Aus Music month, where Australian artists are heavily promoted. This includes a solid weekend of Australian music; some free, limited-entry concerts around the country; All-Australian feature albums; Live at the Wireless; and each day, a new "unknown" Australian band is featured and played several times during the day.

J Awards

The J Awards are an annual awards ceremony held at the start of December each year to celebrate Australian music. Awards include; the Unearthed J Award for best Unearthed artist, the J Award for Australian Music Video of the year, and the main J Award for Australian album of the year, judged by a panel of Triple J presenters. Past winners of the J Award include; Wolfmother (2005), Hilltop Hoods (2006), and The Panics (2007). In 2008, The Presets took the award for Apocalypso. In 2009 the award was won by Sarah Blasko. In 2010, Tame Impala won the coveted J Award. The 2011 winner of best Australian album was Gotye. In 2012 Tame Impala won the award for a second time, this time with Lonerism. In 2013, the electronic artist Flume took out the award with his self-titled debut album. In 2019 Matt Corby was awarded album of the year for Rainbow Valley''.

See also

 List of radio stations in Australia
 Triple J announcers (Category)
 BBC Radio 1
 Tom Cardy, Australian comedian and musician
 CBC Radio 3
 BBC Radio 6 Music
 Le Mouv'
 FM4
 MDR Sputnik

References

External links
  – includes live audio streaming of the station's broadcast, as well as archives of recent editions of shows.
 Conference paper: Fandom, Triple J and the Unearthed competition: a regional perspective by Kate Ames, Central Queensland University
 Triple J's 30th Anniversary webpage featuring historical information about key events in the station's history as well as vintage audio and video
 Jplay  JJJ Playlists
 Link to Triple J frequency finder
 Meet the Team : Triple-J  – [PIAS]'s Blog, 18 March 2015

 
APRA Award winners
Australian comedy
Australian radio networks
Public radio in Australia
Radio stations established in 1975
1975 establishments in Australia